Tokor is a village in the Ketu Municipal district, a district on the south-eastern corner of the Volta Region of Ghana, near the Ghana-Togo border.

References

Populated places in the Volta Region